The Brütsch Mopetta is an egg-shaped, single-seat, three-wheel automobile manufactured from 1956 to 1958 with a total production of 14. It was the smallest in a series of microcars designed by Egon Brütsch.

With a single wheel at the front, the Mopetta is an open roadster with a fiberglass body, with one example having a detachable, transparent, folding hood. The Mopetta used a  ILO V50 engine with a pull start and an integral three-speed gearbox.

Each Mopetta cost £200 (c£2000, 2017) as the most produced car by Brütsch, only 5 are known to survive.  There were negotiations with Opel to distribute the car, but only sales brochures were produced.

A Brütsch Mopetta replica is available, built in the UK with a modern Honda automatic engine.

Sources 
Kleinwagen, Small Cars, Petites Voitures, by Benedikt Taschen, 1994

External links
 Images of the car

Microcars
Three-wheeled motor vehicles
Cars of Germany

Cars introduced in 1956